Max Holzmann (31 March 1899 – 27 January 1994) was a Swiss cardiologist.

Early life
Max Holzmann was born on 31 March 1899 in Zurich, the son of physician Moritz Holzmann and Anna Helena Lerch. Holzmann took a degree in medicine in Zurich and Lausanne, and in 1923 graduated with a doctor of medicine degree. Holzmann worked as a doctor in Vienna, Paris and at the University Hospital in Zurich.

Holzmann taught from 1959 to 1969 as a lecturer and honorary professor at the University of Zurich. He also acted in 1948 as co-founder of the Swiss Society of Cardiology, of which he was president from 1952 to 1955.

Later life
He died on 27 January 1994 in Zurich, two months before his 95th birthday.

Personal life
In 1931, Holzmann married Elisa, daughter of Emil Rüegg, in Zurich.

Publications 
Holzmann published over a hundred papers on radiology and electrocardiography.
 Clinical Electrocardiography (textbook), 1945–1965, 5th edition

Honours
 1955, Marcel Benoist Prize awarded, for his textbook and his life's work

References

External links
 Literature by and about Max Holzmann in the catalog of the German National Library
 Article with photo of Max Holzmann on the website www.marcel-benoist.ch

1899 births
1994 deaths
Swiss cardiologists
Academic staff of the University of Zurich
Physicians from Zürich
20th-century Swiss physicians
Textbook writers